Enrique Guardia (11 May 1952 – 19 March 2018) was a Spanish water polo player. He competed in the men's tournament at the 1972 Summer Olympics.

References

1952 births
2018 deaths
Spanish male water polo players
Olympic water polo players of Spain
Water polo players at the 1972 Summer Olympics
Water polo players from Barcelona